Nikolay Dimitrov-Džajić' (born 4 November 1970, in Petrich) is a Bulgarian former football player. He played as a right back and spent the majority of his career with Litex Lovech.

Born in Petrich, Dimitrov was a product of the Belasitsa Petrich system. He was signed by Litex Lovech in 1996 and spent the remainder of his career with the club. He spent nine seasons of his career at Litex, before retiring at the age of 35 in 2005. During that period, Dimitrov won two A PFG titles and two Bulgarian Cups. He had played 241 games in all competitions for Litex, scoring seven goals.

Dimtrov was head coach of Belasitsa in the 2016–17 South-West Third League but stepped down in June 2017.

Litex statistics

Honours

Club
Litex Lovech
 A PFG: 1997–98, 1998–99
  Bulgarian Cup: 2001, 2004

References 

Bulgarian footballers
PFC Belasitsa Petrich players
PFC Litex Lovech players
First Professional Football League (Bulgaria) players
People from Petrich
1970 births
Living people
Association football defenders
Sportspeople from Blagoevgrad Province